Faith No More, a San Francisco-based band, have recorded approximately 100 songs over the course of their career; this includes material from six studio albums, one live album, and numerous B-side tracks and out-takes. Faith No More were founded in 1981 as Sharp Young Men, and changed their name to Faith. No Man before releasing the 1982 double A-side single "Quiet in Heaven" / "Song of Liberty". Upon assuming the name Faith No More, the band's first two full-length albums, We Care a Lot and Introduce Yourself, were driven mostly by new vocalist Chuck Mosley and the "metallic guitar" of Jim Martin, blending elements of rap and heavy metal music. Mosley was later replaced by Mr. Bungle vocalist Mike Patton, who added lyrics to the already-written music for 1989's The Real Thing. Their next studio album, Angel Dust, moved away from the band's rap-influenced sound to experiment with different musical genres; a trend which became much more pronounced on the 1995 album King for a Day... Fool for a Lifetime.

Between the recording of the latter two albums, Martin left the band. Reports are mixed as to whether he quit or was fired; however he had stopped contributing to the band's output during the recording of Angel Dust, leaving bass player Billy Gould to record guitar parts for "Another Body Murdered", the band's contribution to the Judgment Night soundtrack. Martin's guitarist role was filled during the recording for King for a Day... Fool for a Lifetime by Patton's Mr. Bungle bandmate Trey Spruance, and on the accompanying tour by roadie Dean Menta. While recording their final album, Album of the Year, the band was joined by guitarist Jon Hudson. Hudson was also present for the band's collaboration with Sparks, which produced two songs, including the single "This Town Ain't Big Enough for Both of Us".  In 1998, they released the compilation Who Cares a Lot?, which contains a number of previously unreleased songs.

Among Faith No More's best known songs are "We Care a Lot", an "antiprotest" song which exists in a different version on each of the Mosley-fronted albums; "Epic", a breakthrough hit which spent three weeks at number one in Australia and made the top ten in the United States; and "Midlife Crisis", which has featured in the 2004 video game Grand Theft Auto: San Andreas. The band officially split up in April 1998, reforming again in 2009 for a series of tours. The band's first album since reuniting, Sol Invictus, was released in 2015, preceded by the single "Motherfucker".

List of songs

See also 
List of songs recorded by Tomahawk
Faith No More discography
Mike Patton discography

Notes

References 

Bibliography

Album notes

 

Singles notes
 "Quiet in Heaven" / "Song of Liberty" (Single notes). Faith. No Man. Ministry of Propaganda. 1982.
 "From Out of Nowhere" (Single notes). Faith No More. Slash Records. 1989.
 "Songs to Make Love To" (EP notes). Faith No More. Slash Records. 1993.
 "Digging the Grave" (Single notes). Faith No More. Slash Records. 1995.
 "Ricochet" (Single notes). Faith No More. Slash Records. 1995.
 "Ashes to Ashes" (Single notes). Faith No More. Slash Records. 1997.

 
Faith No More